is a Japanese ice hockey player. She has played for Japan in the World Women's Championship Division 1 for two years. In 2008, she played for Japan again, this time in the Top Division.

Adachi competed at both the 2014 and the 2018 Winter Olympics.

Statistics
Source:

References

1985 births
Living people
Ice hockey players at the 2014 Winter Olympics
Ice hockey players at the 2018 Winter Olympics
Olympic ice hockey players of Japan
Japanese women's ice hockey forwards
Asian Games gold medalists for Japan
Asian Games silver medalists for Japan
Medalists at the 2007 Asian Winter Games
Medalists at the 2011 Asian Winter Games
Medalists at the 2017 Asian Winter Games
Ice hockey players at the 2007 Asian Winter Games
Ice hockey players at the 2011 Asian Winter Games
Ice hockey players at the 2017 Asian Winter Games
Asian Games medalists in ice hockey